A number of steamships were named Rheinland, including:

, a German cargo ship in service 1885–1905
, a German cargo ship wrecked in 1926

Ship names